The Samuel Hirst Three-Decker is a historic triple decker in Worcester, Massachusetts.  It is a well-preserved example of a Colonial Revival house built late in Worcester's westward expansion of triple-decker construction.  It follows a typical side hall plan, with a distinctive front porch supported by paired square pillars through all three levels.  The roof has an extended eave that is decorated with brackets and dentil molding.

The building was listed on the National Register of Historic Places in 1990.

See also
National Register of Historic Places listings in southwestern Worcester, Massachusetts
National Register of Historic Places listings in Worcesterд County, Massachusetts

References

Apartment buildings on the National Register of Historic Places in Massachusetts
Colonial Revival architecture in Massachusetts
Houses completed in 1918
Houses in Worcester, Massachusetts
National Register of Historic Places in Worcester, Massachusetts